Royal Garden Blues is an album by the American saxophonist Branford Marsalis, released in 1986. Marsalis promoted it with a North American tour.

The album was nominated for a Grammy Award, in the "Best Jazz Instrumental Performance, Soloist" category. It peaked at No. 2 on Billboard'''s Traditional Jazz Albums chart.

ProductionRoyal Garden Blues was produced by Delfeayo Marsalis. Ron Carter and Herbie Hancock contributed to the album.

The title track is a cover of the jazz standard. Its video was directed by Spike Lee. "Strike Up the Band" is a version of the song composed by George Gershwin. "Emanon" was written by Wynton Marsalis. "Shadows was written by Larry Willis. Ellis Marsalis played piano on "Swingin' at the Haven", which he also wrote. "The Wrath of Tain", a tribute to drummer Jeff "Tain" Watts, was written by Branford.

Critical reception

Robert Christgau labeled Marsalis the "more fun" member of the family, but determined that "his artistic personality is still unformed." The Los Angeles Times noted that "despite having been bitten by the rhythm-and-blues bug and stung by Sting, the saxophonist-leader leaves no doubt that jazz is his home turf." The Sun-Sentinel stated that the music "is played very conservatively, without any hint of modern musical forms, instrumentation or rhythms."

The Chicago Tribune concluded: "Formerly inclined to summon up as much heat as possible, Marsalis seems to have realized that he is not a passionate, ecstatic player but a coolheaded, technically agile craftsman." The New York Times wrote that the album is "steeped in the songful, harmonically complex style of the mid-1960's Miles Davis quintet and of the Blue Note Records stable." The Sunday Times considered the title track "a serious, unflinching improvisation."

AllMusic deemed Royal Garden Blues'' "one of Branford's more playful albums."

Track listing

References

Branford Marsalis albums
1986 albums
Columbia Records albums